This is the discography of the German synthpop duo Modern Talking. The duo has released their material over two separate time periods: the first batch between 1984-1987, and then, after reunifying and making a successful comeback in 1998, between 1998-2003. Modern Talking's sound, however, was different after their reunion: they switched from their original 1980s mellow Europop sound to 1990s up-tempo Eurodance sound, which was in high demand in central Europe at the time.

Throughout their existence, Modern Talking have released 20 singles, 12 studio-albums, 17 international compilation-albums and two video albums.

Modern Talking's global sales, after the duo's second and final break-up in 2003, had reached 120 million singles and albums combined, making them the biggest-selling German music act in history.

Albums

Studio albums

Compilation albums

Singles

Notes

References

Discographies of German artists
Pop music group discographies
Electronic music discographies
Discography